Arasavanangadu  is a village in the Kudavasal taluk of Tiruvarur district in Tamil Nadu, India.

Demographics 

As per the 2001 census, Arasavanangadu had a population of 1,497 with 761 males and 736 females. The sex ratio was 967. The literacy rate was 72.33.

References 

 

Villages in Tiruvarur district